This is a complete list of four-star admirals in the United States Coast Guard. The rank of admiral (or full admiral, or four-star admiral) is the highest rank in the U.S. Coast Guard. It ranks above vice admiral (three-star admiral) and below Fleet Admiral (five-star admiral).

There have been 23 four-star admirals in the history of the U.S. Coast Guard. Of these, 22 achieved that rank while on active duty and one was promoted upon retirement in recognition of combat citations. All were commissioned via the United States Coast Guard Academy or its predecessor, the School of Instruction of the United States Revenue Cutter Service.  Prior to the Vice Commandant of the U.S. Coast Guard being elevated to a four-star position in 2016, all four-star admirals in the U.S. Coast Guard held the position of Commandant of the U.S. Coast Guard.

List of admirals
The following list of four-star admirals is sortable by last name, date of rank, number of years on active duty at four-star rank (Yrs), active-duty positions held while serving at four-star rank, year commissioned and source of commission, and number of years in commission when promoted to four-star rank (YC), and other biographical notes.

Tombstone admirals
The Act of Congress of March 4, 1925, allowed officers in the Navy, Marine Corps, and Coast Guard to be promoted one grade upon retirement if they had been specially commended for performance of duty in actual combat. Combat citation promotions were colloquially known as "tombstone promotions" because they conferred the prestige of the higher rank but not the additional retirement pay, so their only practical benefit was to allow recipients to engrave a loftier title on their business cards and tombstones. The Act of Congress of February 23, 1942, enabled tombstone promotions to three- and four-star grades. Tombstone promotions were subsequently restricted to citations issued before January 1, 1947, and finally eliminated altogether effective November 1, 1959.

Any admiral who actually served in a grade while on active duty receives precedence on the retired list over any tombstone admiral holding the same retired grade. Tombstone admirals rank among each other according to the dates of their highest active duty grade.

The following list of tombstone admirals is sortable by last name, date of rank as vice admiral, date retired, and year commissioned.

Timeline

The first full admiral in the United States Coast Guard was Russell R. Waesche, who served as commandant from 1936 to 1945 and was promoted to that rank on April 4, 1945. His successor as commandant, John Farley, also inherited the rank of admiral. After Farley retired on December 31, 1949, the commandant's rank was reduced to vice admiral, although Farley's successor, Merlin O'Neill, was promoted to full admiral upon retirement in recognition of combat citations. O'Neill's successor, Alfred C. Richmond, remained a vice admiral until the commandant's rank was again elevated to admiral on June 1, 1960, where it has remained ever since.

Notes

References

See also
 General (United States)
 List of active duty United States four-star officers
 List of United States Air Force four-star generals
 List of United States Army four-star generals
 List of United States Marine Corps four-star generals
 List of United States Navy four-star admirals
 List of United States military leaders by rank
 List of United States Public Health Service Commissioned Corps four-star admirals
 List of United States Space Force four-star generals
 List of United States Coast Guard vice admirals

United States Coast Guard
Coast Guard four-star admirals
 
Coast Guard admirals
United States Coast Guard